Cities and towns under the oblast's jurisdiction:
Belgorod (Белгород) (administrative center)
city okrugs:
Vostochny (Восточный)
Zapadny (Западный)
Alexeyevka (Алексеевка)
Gubkin (Губкин)
Shebekino (Шебекино)
Stary Oskol (Старый Оскол)
Valuyki (Валуйки)
Districts:
Alexeyevsky (Алексеевский)
with 20 municipal okrugs under the district's jurisdiction.
Belgorodsky (Белгородский)
Urban-type settlements under the district's jurisdiction:
Oktyabrsky (Октябрьский)
Razumnoye (Разумное)
Severny (Северный)
with 21 municipal okrugs under the district's jurisdiction.
Borisovsky (Борисовский)
Urban-type settlements under the district's jurisdiction:
Borisovka (Борисовка)
with 8 municipal okrugs under the district's jurisdiction.
Chernyansky (Чернянский)
Urban-type settlements under the district's jurisdiction:
Chernyanka (Чернянка)
with 15 municipal okrugs under the district's jurisdiction.
Grayvoronsky (Грайворонский)
Towns under the district's jurisdiction:
Grayvoron (Грайворон)
with 12 municipal okrugs under the district's jurisdiction.
Gubkinsky (Губкинский)
Ivnyansky (Ивнянский)
Urban-type settlements under the district's jurisdiction:
Ivnya (Ивня)
with 13 municipal okrugs under the district's jurisdiction.
Korochansky (Корочанский)
Towns under the district's jurisdiction:
Korocha (Короча)
with 22 municipal okrugs under the district's jurisdiction.
Krasnensky (Красненский)
with 10 municipal okrugs under the district's jurisdiction.
Krasnogvardeysky (Красногвардейский)
Towns under the district's jurisdiction:
Biryuch (Бирюч)
with 13 municipal okrugs under the district's jurisdiction.
Krasnoyaruzhsky (Краснояружский)
Urban-type settlements under the district's jurisdiction:
Krasnaya Yaruga (Красная Яруга)
with 7 municipal okrugs under the district's jurisdiction.
Novooskolsky (Новооскольский)
Towns under the district's jurisdiction:
Novy Oskol (Новый Оскол)
with 17 municipal okrugs under the district's jurisdiction.
Prokhorovsky (Прохоровский)
Urban-type settlements under the district's jurisdiction:
Prokhorovka (Прохоровка)
with 17 municipal okrugs under the district's jurisdiction.
Rakityansky (Ракитянский)
Urban-type settlements under the district's jurisdiction:
Proletarsky (Пролетарский)
Rakitnoye (Ракитное)
with 11 municipal okrugs under the district's jurisdiction.
Rovensky (Ровеньский)
Urban-type settlements under the district's jurisdiction:
Rovenki (Ровеньки)
with 11 municipal okrugs under the district's jurisdiction.
Shebekinsky (Шебекинский)
Urban-type settlements under the district's jurisdiction:
Maslova Pristan (Маслова Пристань)
with 13 municipal okrugs under the district's jurisdiction.
Starooskolsky (Старооскольский)
Valuysky (Валуйский)
Urban-type settlements under the district's jurisdiction:
Urazovo (Уразово)
with 14 municipal okrugs under the district's jurisdiction.
Veydelevsky (Вейделевский)
Urban-type settlements under the district's jurisdiction:
Veydelevka (Вейделевка)
with 11 municipal okrugs under the district's jurisdiction.
Volokonovsky (Волоконовский)
Urban-type settlements under the district's jurisdiction:
Pyatnitskoye (Пятницкое)
Volokonovka (Волоконовка)
with 12 municipal okrugs under the district's jurisdiction.
Yakovlevsky (Яковлевский)
Towns under the district's jurisdiction:
Stroitel (Строитель)
Urban-type settlements under the district's jurisdiction:
Tomarovka (Томаровка)
Yakovlevo (Яковлево)
with 14 municipal okrugs under the district's jurisdiction.

References

Belgorod Oblast
Belgorod Oblast